In neuroanatomy, the optic radiation (also known as the geniculocalcarine tract, the geniculostriate pathway, and posterior thalamic radiation) are axons from the neurons in the lateral geniculate nucleus to the primary visual cortex. The optic radiation receives blood through deep branches of the middle cerebral artery and posterior cerebral artery.

They carry visual information through two divisions (called upper and lower division) to the visual cortex (also called striate cortex) along the calcarine fissure. There is one set of upper and lower divisions on each side of the brain. If a lesion only exists in one unilateral division of the optic radiation, the consequence is called quadrantanopia, which implies that only the respective superior or inferior quadrant of the visual field is affected. If both divisions on one side of the brain are affected, the result is a contralateral homonymous hemianopsia.

Structure

The upper division:

 Projects to the upper bank of the calcarine fissure, called the cuneus
 Contains input from the superior retinal quadrants, which represents the inferior visual field quadrants 
 Transection causes contralateral lower quadrantanopia
 Lesions that involve both cunei cause a lower altitudinal hemianopia (altitudinopia)

The lower division:

 Loops from the lateral geniculate body anteriorly (Meyer's loop), then posteriorly, to terminate in the lower bank of the calcarine sulcus, called the lingual gyrus
 Contains input from the inferior retinal quadrants, which represents the superior visual field quadrants
 Transection causes contralateral upper quadrantanopia
 Transection of both lingual gyri causes an upper altitudinal hemianopia

Parts
A distinctive feature of the optic radiations is that they split into two parts on each side:

*Note: In 2009, an anonymous medical doctor edited the "Optic Radiation" Wikipedia article and added the eponymous name "Baum's loop," referring to the dorsal bundle. Despite the information being unverified, this name subsequently entered scholarly articles and textbooks and persisted until three radiologists discovered the fabrication in 2020.

Function
The optic radiation contains tracts which transmit visual information from the retina of the eye to the visual cortex. Lesions of the optic radiations are usually unilateral and commonly vascular in origin. Field defects therefore develop abruptly, in contrast to the slow progression of defects associated with tumors.

Clinical significance

Examination
Tracts contained within the optic radiation are examined as part of a cranial nerve examination.

References

External links

 
 https://web.archive.org/web/20070512234857/http://www2.umdnj.edu/~neuro/studyaid/Practical2000/Q34.htm
 A 3D model of  optic tract and optic radiation

Visual system
Thalamus